Bhaiṣajyaguru, or Bhaishajyaguru, formally Bhaiṣajya-guru-vaiḍūrya-prabhā-rāja ("Medicine Master and King of Lapis Lazuli Light"; ,), is the Buddha of healing and medicine in Mahāyāna Buddhism. Commonly referred to as the "Medicine Buddha", he is described as a doctor who cures suffering (Pali/Sanskrit: dukkha/duḥkha) using the medicine of his teachings.

Bhaiṣajyaguru's original name and title was rāja (King), but Xuanzang translated it as Tathāgata (Buddha). Subsequent translations and commentaries followed Xuanzang in describing him as a Buddha. The image of Bhaiṣajyaguru is usually expressed with a canonical Buddha-like form holding a gallipot and, in some versions, possessing blue skin. Though also considered to be a guardian of the East, in most cases Akshobhya is given that role. As an exceptional case, the honzon of Mount Kōya's Kongōbu Temple was changed from Akshobhya to Bhaiṣajyaguru.

Origin

Bhaiṣajyaguru is described in the eponymous Bhaiṣajya-guru-vaiḍūrya-prabhā-rāja Sūtra, commonly called the Medicine Buddha Sutra, as a bodhisattva who made twelve (12) great vows.  On achieving Buddhahood, he became the Buddha of the eastern pure land of Vaiḍūryanirbhāsa "Pure Lapis Lazuli".  There, he is attended to by two bodhisattvas symbolizing the light of the sun and the light of the moon respectively:

 Sūryaprabha
 Candraprabha

A Sanskrit manuscript of the Bhaiṣajya-guru-vaiḍūrya-prabhā-rāja Sūtra was among the texts attesting to the popularity of Bhaiṣajyaguru in the ancient northwest Indian kingdom of Gandhāra. The manuscripts in this find are dated before the 7th century, and are written in the upright Gupta script.

The Chinese Buddhist monk Xuanzang visited a Mahāsāṃghika monastery at Bamiyan, Afghanistan, in the 7th century CE, and the site of this monastery has been rediscovered by archaeologists. Birchbark manuscript fragments from several Mahāyāna sūtras have been discovered at the site, including the Bhaiṣajya-guru-vaidūrya-prabha-rāja Sūtra (MS 2385).

His twelve vows 

The twelve vows of Medicine Buddha upon attaining Enlightenment, according to the Medicine Buddha Sutra are:

I vow that my body shall shine as beams of brilliant light on this infinite and boundless world, showering on all beings, getting rid of their ignorance and worries with my teachings. May all beings be like me, with a perfect status and character, upright mind and soul, and finally attaining enlightenment like the Buddha.
I vow that my body be like crystal, pure and flawless, radiating rays of splendid light to every corner, brightening up and enlightening all beings with wisdom. With the blessings of compassion, may all beings strengthen their spiritual power and physical energy, so that they could fulfill their dreams on the right track.
I vow that I shall grant by means of boundless wisdom, all beings with the inexhaustible things that they require, and relieving them from all pains and guilt resulting from materialistic desires. Although clothing, food, accommodation and transport are essentials, it should be utilized wisely as well. Besides self-consumption, the remaining should be generously shared with the community so that all could live harmoniously together.
I vow to lead those who have gone astray back to the path of righteousness. Let them be corrected and returned to the Buddha way for enlightenment.
I vow that I shall enable all sentient beings to observe precepts for spiritual purity and moral conduct. Should there be any relapse or violation, they shall be guided by repentance. Provided they sincerely regret their wrong-doings, and vow for a change with constant prayers and strong faith in the Buddha, they could receive the rays of forgiveness, recover their lost moral and purity.
I vow that all beings who are physically disabled or sick in all aspects be blessed with good health, both physically and mentally. All who pay homage to Buddha faithfully will be blessed.
I vow to relieve all pain and poverty of the very sick and poor. The sick be cured, the helpless be helped, the poor be assisted.
I vow to help women who are undergoing sufferings and tortures and seeking for transformation into men. By hearing my name, paying homage and praying, their wishes would be granted and ultimately attain Buddhahood.
I vow to free all beings from evil thought and its control. I shall lead them onto the path of light through inculcating them with righteousness and honour so that they will walk the Buddha way.
I vow to save prisoners who have genuinely repented and victims of natural disasters. My supreme powers will bless those who are sincere and be freed from sufferings.
I vow to save those who suffer from starvation and those who committed a crime to obtain food. If they hear my name and faithfully cherish it, I shall lead them to the advantages of Dharma and favour them with the best food that they may eventually lead a tranquil and happy life.
I vow to save those who suffer from poverty, tormented by mosquitoes and wasps day and night. If they come across my name, cherish it with sincerity and practice dharma to strengthen their merits, they will be able to achieve their wishes.

Dharani and mantra

East Asia version
In the Bhaiṣajya-guru-vaiḍūrya-prabhā-rāja Sūtra, the Medicine Buddha is described as having entered into a state of samadhi called "Eliminating All the Suffering and Afflictions of Sentient Beings." From this samadhi state he spoke the Medicine Buddha dharani.

The last line of the dharani is used as Bhaisajyaguru's short form mantra. There are several other mantras for the Medicine Buddha as well that are used in different schools of Vajrayana Buddhism.

Tibetan version
Mahābhaiṣajya is changed to maha bekʰandze radza (མ་ཧཱ་བྷཻ་ཥ་ཛྱེ་རཱ་ཛ་) in the mantra, while 'rāja' (radza) means "king" in Sanskrit. In modern Tibetan language, 'ṣa' (ཥ) is somehow pronounced as 'kʰa' (ཁ), and 'ja' in Sanskrit, as in the cases of 'jye' & 'jya', is historically written with the Tibetan script 'dza' (ཛ). Along with other pronunciation changes, the short mantra is recited as:

Iconography
Bhaiṣajyaguru is typically depicted seated, wearing the three robes of a Buddhist monk, holding a lapis-colored jar of medicine nectar in his left hand and the right hand resting on his right knee, holding the stem of the Aruna fruit or Myrobalan between thumb and forefinger.  In the sutra, he is also described by his aura of lapis lazuli-colored light. In Chinese depictions, he is sometimes holding a pagoda, symbolising the ten thousand Buddhas of the three periods of time. He is also depicted standing on a Northern Wei stele from approximately 500 CE now housed in the Metropolitan Museum of Art, accompanied by his two attendants, Suryaprabha and Chandraprabha. Within the halo are depicted the Seven Bhaiṣajyaguru Buddhas and seven apsaras.

Role in Chinese Buddhism
 
The practice of veneration of the Medicine Buddha is also popular in China, as he is depicted as one of the three prominent Buddhas, the others being the founder Śākyamuni and Amitabha. He can also be viewed as the healing attribute of Śākyamuni, as he is often called the "Medicine King" in sutras.  There are two popular Chinese translations of this sutra: one by Xuanzang and the other by Yijing both translated in the Tang dynasty. The Taisho Tripitaka and Qianlong Tripitaka each have three translations of the sutra:

 By Dharmagupta in 615 CE (Taisho: vol. 14, no. 449; Qianlong: no. 166)
 By Xuanzang in 650 CE (Taisho: vol. 14, no. 450; Qianlong: no. 167)
 By Yijing in 707 CE (Taisho: vol. 14, no. 451; Qianlong: no. 168)

These three versions have different titles:

 Dharmagupta: Sutra of the Vows of the Medicine Buddha
 Xuanzang: Sutra of the Vows of the Medicine Buddha of Lapis Lazuli Crystal Radiance
 Yijing: Sutra of the Vows of the Medicine Buddha of Lapis Lazuli Crystal Radiance and Seven Past Buddhas (no. 168, two scrolls).

The version translated by Yijing includes not only the vows of the Medicine Buddha but also the vows of the Seven Past Buddhas.

Like Tibetan Buddhists, Chinese Buddhists recite the mantra of the Medicine Buddha to overcome mental, physical and spiritual sickness. The Bhaiṣajyaguruvaiḍūryaprabhārāja Sūtra, which the Medicine Buddha is associated with and described in great detail in, is a common sutra to recite in Chinese temples as well. Furthermore, much like the nianfo path of Amitabha, the name of Medicine Buddha is also recited for the benefit of being reborn in the Eastern Pure Lands, though this is deemphasized in favor of the Medicine Buddha's role for the living.

Role in Japanese Buddhism

Starting in the 7th century in Japan, Yakushi was prayed to in the place of Ashuku (Akshobhya).  Some of Yakushi's role has been taken over by Jizō (Ksitigarbha), but Yakushi is still invoked in the traditional memorial services for the dead.

Older temples, those mostly found in the Tendai and Shingon sects, especially those around Kyoto, Nara and the Kinki region often have Yakushi as the center of devotion, unlike later Buddhist sects which focus on Amitabha Buddha or Kannon Bodhisattva almost exclusively.

Role in Tibetan Buddhism

The practice of Medicine Buddha (Sangye Menla in ) is not only a very powerful method for healing and increasing healing powers both for oneself and others, but also for overcoming the inner sickness of attachment, hatred, and ignorance, thus to meditate on the Medicine Buddha can help decrease physical and mental illness and suffering.

The Medicine Buddha mantra is held to be extremely powerful for healing of physical illnesses and purification of negative karma. One form of practice based on the Medicine Buddha is done when one is stricken by disease. The patient is to recite the long Medicine Buddha mantra 108 times over a glass of water. The water is now believed to be blessed by the power of the mantra and the blessing of the Medicine Buddha himself, and the patient is to drink the water. This practice is then repeated each day until the illness is cured.

See also 
 Index of Buddhism-related articles
 Secular Buddhism

References

External links

 Image of Medicine Buddha
 The Sutra on the Original Vows and Merits of the Medicine Master Lapis Lazuli Light Tathagata (藥師琉璃光如來本願功德經): English Translation by the Chung Tai Translation Committee

Buddhas

Exorcism in Buddhism
Gion faith